Ahmed Mourad Bey Zulfikar or Ahmed Mourad Zulfikar (Egyptian Arabic: أحمد مراد بك ذو الفقار; August 18, 1888 – April 3, 1945), was an Egyptian police commissioner in the ministry of Interior. He held the position of Cairo Head of Security in the 1930s and 1940s. He’s a member of the Zulfikar family.

He was born in Cairo on August 18, 1888. Zulfikar was married and has eight children, Mohamed, Soad, Fekreya, Mahmoud, Ezz El-Dine, Kamal, Salah and Mamdouh.

Zulfikar died of a heart attack on April 3, 1945, in Cairo, Egypt.

References 

1888 births
1945 deaths
Egyptian police officers
People from Cairo